American drummer Travis Barker has released one studio album, five extended play (EP), and 60 singles under his own name. Barker, best known for his work with Blink-182, has been a part of various punk rock bands throughout his career, including the Aquabats, Box Car Racer, Transplants, +44, and Goldfinger. Outside of his work in rock music, Barker has worked prolifically in hip hop; he was a member of the supergroup Expensive Taste and the drummer-and-DJ duo TRV$DJAM, and has released extended plays with Yelawolf, and Asher Roth and Nottz. He has also produced music for musicians such as Machine Gun Kelly, Fever 333, Avril Lavigne and Trippie Redd. He holds many guest appearances on songs from a variety of musicians, including many rappers such as Lil Wayne, Paul Wall, the Game, and Run the Jewels. Barker became well known in the late 2000s for creating rock remixes to rap songs. His debut studio album, Give the Drummer Some, was released in 2011 and debuted at number nine on the Billboard 200 in the United States.

Albums

Studio albums

Mixtapes

Extended plays

Singles

As lead artist

As a featured artist

Other charted songs

Guest appearances

Videos

Music videos

Appearances

Production discography

Albums

EPs

Singles

See also
 Blink-182 discography
 List of songs recorded by Blink-182
 Transplants discography

Notes

References

External links
 Travis Barker at AllMusic

Rock music discographies
Discographies of American artists